Fort Hammenhiel is a fort built around a small island between the islands of Kayts and Karaitivu of Jaffna Peninsula in Northern Sri Lanka.

History
The Portuguese built the fort, to guard the entrance to the Jaffna peninsula, in the mid 17th century of quarried coral naming it Fortaleza do Caes (Fort Royal). The Dutch, under the command of Captains Cornelies Reb, Piester Waset and N. van der Reede, captured the fort in March 1658 and subsequently renamed it Hammenhiel (Heel of the Ham), as they considered that shape of Ceylon resembled a smoked ham and the fort was located at the point where the shank bone projects. The Dutch rebuilt the fort in 1680, constructing a stone breakwater, filling in the hollow ramparts, replacing the upper floor with a stone vault and building a brick lined reservoir to the north of the fort. The prison has nine large dungeons to store gunpowder. The Dutch maintained a garrison of about thirty soldiers under the charge of a Lieutenant or Ensign.

The British used the fort firstly as a maximum security prison and then as an infectious diseases hospital. During the Second World War, it was used as a base for the “Special Operations Group “ including the now UK military Special Boat Service.

Notable inmates
In 1971 Rohana Wijeweera, founder leader of the Janatha Vimukthi Peramuna, was detained in the fort after his arrest. It was later used to house other prisoners of the abortive 1971 JVP insurrection. Those detained included Upatissa Gamanayake, Lionel Bopage, Podi Athula (Victor Ivan), Loku Athula (N. Jayasinghe), Prof. Jayadeva Uyangoda and Mahinda Wijesekara (who was to later to become a minister).

Later use
Having plenty of space and the proper location to detain prisoners, it was used thereafter by the Sri Lanka Navy to detain sailors accused of wrongdoings. Now it has been transformed into a tourist hotel run by the Sri Lanka Navy.

See also
 Jaffna Fort
Forts of Sri Lanka

References 

Hammenhiel
Hammenhiel
Military installations in Northern Province, Sri Lanka
Hammenhiel
Sri Lanka Navy
Archaeological protected monuments in Jaffna District
Buildings and structures associated with the Dutch East India Company